1–inch Type C (designated Type C by SMPTE) is a professional reel-to-reel analog recording helical scan videotape format co-developed and introduced by Ampex and Sony in 1976. It became the replacement in the professional video and broadcast television industries for the then-incumbent 2–inch quadruplex videotape (2–inch Quad for short) open-reel format. Additionally, it replaced the unsuccessful type A format, also invented by Ampex, and, primarily in mainland Europe, it supplemented the type B format, invented by the Fernseh division of Bosch, but it was replaced by type C format also there.

Technical detail
Compared to Quad, Type C had a smaller size, comparative ease of operation, and slightly higher video quality. 1–inch Type C is capable of "trick-play" functions such as still, shuttle, and variable-speed playback, including slow motion. 2–inch quadruplex videotape machines lacked these capabilities, due to the segmented manner in which it recorded video tracks onto the magnetic tape. 1–inch Type C VTRs required much less maintenance and used less power and space than did 2–inch machines.

1–inch Type C records composite video at a very high video quality that was superior to contemporary color-under formats such as U-matic, and of comparable quality to analog component video formats like Betacam and MII. Both analog component formats were notoriously fussy and trouble-prone, so in practice Type C gave a stable, more reliable picture than the broadcast quality analog cassette-based videotape formats. Because television was broadcast as a composite signal, there was no real downside to Type C in television broadcasting and distribution. It had approximately 300 (scan or vertical) lines of resolution, and a bandwidth of 5 MHz, with recording being done with the heads moving across the tape at (a writing speed of) 1,008 inches per second.

Type C VTRs can record a single complete video frame in a single revolution of the drum, using a single video head, which made the format useful in computer animation and allowed for stills without frame stores or buffers. The tape is almost completely wrapped around the drum of the VTR in what is known as an alpha wrap. The format is almost 
immune to dropouts. PAL Type C VTRs may have higher writing speeds to achieve higher bandwidth given PAL's 5-6 MHz bandwidth versus NTSC's 4.2 MHz. Type C VTRs may have flying video erase heads mounted on the drum, allowing for individual frames to be erased.

Usage
1-inch tape gained numerous uses in television production including outside broadcasts where it was used for instant replays and creating programme titles. 1-inch machines were considerably smaller and more reliable than preceding two-inch versions and were seen by operators as a major technological breakthrough. Due to this smaller size, it was possible for OB crews to transport and use multiple machines, allowing for much more complex editing to be done on site for use within the programme. The quality and reliability of 1–inch Type C made it a mainstay in television and video production in television studios for almost 20 years, before being supplanted by more reliable digital videocassette formats like Digital Betacam, DVCAM, and DVCPRO. 1–inch Type C was also widely used for the mastering of early LaserDisc titles. It was replaced in that role by the digital D-2 videocassette format in the late 1980s.

Ampex models
Models include:
 VPR-2 1976, studio model
 VPR-20 1977, Portable
 VPR-2A studio model
 VPR-2B studio model
 VPR-80 studio model
 VPR-6 studio model
 SMC-60 slow Motion system
 VPR-3 studio model, with air system like AVR-1
 XVR-80 wideband VTR
 VPR-5 portable made in jointly with Nagra

Marconi models
Models include:
  MR2 studio model

Sony models
Models include:

 BVH-1000 1979 studio model
 BVH-1100 with Dynamic head Tracking- DT, with digital TBC Model BVT-2000
 BVH-1180 with Dynamic head Tracking- DT, with digital TBC Model BVT-2000
 BVH-500 portable
 BVH-2000 studio model
 BVH-2180 3-hour record / play capability
 BVH-2500 Delta Time VTR
 BVH-2800/2 VTR With PCM Audio
 BVH-2830 VTR with PCM Audio and 3-hour record / play capability
 BVH-3000 Studio model
 BVH-3100 Studio model without sync channel record / play capability

Hitachi, Ltd. – Shibaden models
Models include:

 HR-200 Studio model
 HR-230 2 and 3 hour Record/Play Studio model
 HR-100 portable model, 42 pounds

NEC models
Models include:
 TT-7000 Studio VTR ($38,000 new in 1987)

RCA models
Models include:
 TH-100 was a re-badged Sony BVH-1000.
 TH-200A was a re-badged Sony BVH-1100A.
 TH-50 was re-badged Sony portable.
 TR-800 was an RCA engineered and built VTR, likely why it has the "TR-" designation, as all the RCA Quad recorders did. While the TR-800 was developed by RCA, the scanner assembly and upper drum could be replaced with Sony BVH-1100A parts.

In 1983, RCA turned to Ampex for supply of Helical VTRs.
 TH-400 was a re-badged Ampex VPR-80
 TH-900 was a re-badged Ampex VPR-3
 TH-700 was a re-badged Ampex VPR-6

3M models
Models include:
 TT-7000 (built by NEC)

Kometa models (Soviet Union)
Models include:
 Кадр-103СЦ (Kadr-103STs), 1985 studio model with DSP and Цифра-101 (Tsifra-101) digital time base corrector

See also
 Type A videotape
 Type B videotape
 IVC videotape format
 Ampex 2 inch helical VTR

References

External links
 Discussion and demonstration of 1 inch tape in outside broadcast use and comparison with 2 inch machines
 Demonstration of use of 1 inch tape to create captions in OB production
 Information on a 1 inch Type C VTR, the Ampex VPR-1.
 VPR-2
 labguysworld.com Ampex VPR
 
 
 
 
 
 
 Video editing and post-production: a professional guide, page 45, By Gary H. Anderson
 lionlamb.us Ampex List
 montreuxsounds.com Sony "C"

Products introduced in 1976
Composite video formats
History of television
Television terminology
Videotape